Derrick C. Brown is a comedian, poet/performer and founder of Write Bloody Publishing. He is the author of several books of poetry and is a popular touring author. He lived outside of Austin, Texas in Elgin, Texas and currently resides in Los Angeles.

Life 
Brown graduated from Pacifica High School in 1991 and became a decorated paratrooper for the 82nd Airborne in Ft. Bragg, North Carolina for three years from 1991-1993. He is a disabled veteran due to hearing loss from artillery while being enlisted during the First Gulf War. He studied Speech and Debate (Forensics), Playwriting and Broadcast Journalism at Cypress College, Palomar College and Northern Arizona University in Flagstaff Arizona.

Music 

Brown was the lead singer/songwriter of the John Wilkes Kissing Booth and All Black Cinema.  Most recently, he performs with musician Beau Jennings in the group "Night Reports" which focuses on haunted baseball themed music. He credits his background in independent music for much of his success with his touring career and publishing house.

Poetry / Performance 

Brown first discovered poetry when he was enlisted in the 82nd Airborne. His involvement with poetry escalated when he became involved with the Long Beach and Orange County Poetry Slam community.  He competed at his first National Poetry Slam in 1998, where he placed second in the National Poetry Slam individual championship in 1998. He began touring nationally with his poetry shortly thereafter. To date, Brown has performed at over 1800 venues and universities, including Glastonbury, La Sorbonne in Paris, CBGB's, The Nuyorican Poets Café in New York City, The Mission Creek Literary Festival and The Berlin International Literary Festival.

Early in his career, Brown often toured solo. However, he became known for touring and collaborating with other artists.  In October 2006, Brown teamed up with poet and actress Amber Tamblyn for several poetry performances in California called The Lazers of Sexcellance. In 2007, he toured Europe opening for the band Cold War Kids, chronicled in the documentary poetry concert film about him, You Belong Everywhere. In 2009, The All Tomorrow's Parties Festival, curated by The Flaming Lips, invited Derrick Brown to be the opening act for comedian David Cross. Brown performed with The Navy Gravy. IN 2006, Brown collaborated with painter Blaine Fontana for a live reading and gallery opening of new paintings based on Brown's work. Brown performed as a poet on The Tonight show with Jay Leno in 2007 with Cold War Kids, Elvis Perkins and Jessica Alba.

Brown was known for curating unique poetry events like the Double Decker Poetry Bus Party and poetry shows at sea for Poetry Cruise, which he started in Long Beach CA, 2008.

Brown has performed for the Best American Contemporary Poetry Concert series, The Drums Inside Your Chest, curated by Mindy Nettifee and Amber Tamblyn. He appears in the film of the same name.

In 2011, Brown was commissioned to write a new, 40-55 minute long poem for the Noord Nederlands Dans Collective, choreographed by Juilliard alum Stephen Shropshire. The work, Instrumental,  was achieved by using fourteen dancers, an orchestra, one poet and was conducted by Emily Wells and Timmy Straw. It received highly positive reviews in the Netherlands and Canada.

The Poetry Revival Tours

In 2007, Brown began touring annually with Buddy Wakefield and Anis Mojgani, calling their group “The Poetry Revival.” Each year, the group invited other popular performance poets and musicians to join them for certain legs of the tour, and altered the name slightly to reflect the changing line-up. 2007 was known as "Solomon Sparrow's Electric Whale Revival". 2008 was known as "Junkyard Ghost Revival". 2009 was known the "Elephant Engine High Dive Revival". And 2010 was known as the "Night Kite Revival". These poetry events were performed to large crowds across the United States.

Write Bloody Publishing 

In 2004, Brown started Write Bloody Publishing, an independent press founded in Nashville, TN. It moved headquarters to Long Beach, CA and in 2012, moved it again to Austin, Texas. Brown is quoted as saying that he utilizes a record label model for running his publishing company.

In 2012, Brown launched The Shelf Life Poetry project to send poetry books that would otherwise be shredded to homeless shelters, prisons and underfunded youth writing programs.

In 2012, Brown opened up the first all-poetry physical bookshop for his press, called Write Bloody, in Austin, Texas.

Books 

Junebug Melatonin (Kapow!)
Workin Mime to Five, Cruise Ship Pantomimery revealed! (alias, Dick Richards)  (Write Bloody Publishing) 2011
I Love You Is Back (Write Bloody Publishing)
Born in the Year of the Butterfly Knife (Write Bloody Publishing)
Scandalabra: Poetry & Prose  (Write Bloody Publishing)
Strange Light (Write Bloody Publishing) 2012
Our Poison Horse, Write Bloody Publishing 2014
How the Body Works the Dark, (not a cult) 2017
Hello, it doesn't matter. (Write Bloody Publishing) 2018

Children's Books (Write Fuzzy Publishing)
Hot Hands and Ralph In The Weirdo Winter
I Looooove You, Whale!
Valentine The Porcupine Dances Funny

Anthologies

Collections in which Derrick Brown's work is included:

Amalgamate, The art of Blaine Fontana (Zero+ Publishing) 2011 978-0982246153
Elephant Engine High Dive Revival (Write Bloody Publishing), 2009)
The Good Things About America (Write Bloody Publishing), 2009)
Junkyard Ghost Revival (Write Bloody Publishing), 2008)
Spoken Word Revolution, Redux (Sourcebooks) 978-1402208690
The Last American Valentine (Write Bloody Publishing), 2007)
So Luminous The Wildflowers, (Tebot Bach)
Beyond The Valley of The Contemporary Poets (VCP, 1999)
Blue Arc West, (Tebot Bach)
Planet Slam, (German)
Poetry Slam (Manic D Press, 2000)
Aim For The Head, An Anthology of Zombie Poetry (Write Bloody Publishing)
Learn Then Burn. Poems For The Classroom (Write Bloody Publishing)

Albums 
You're all out, Night Reports
Greatest Slits, poetry by Derrick Brown
*A Threat in the Broadcast, The John Wilkes Kissing Booth
Black Urchin, poetry by Derrick Brown, Music by Richard Swift
All Black Cinema, It's like Stars Hitting Ice, Indie Rock
My Hands, Your Neck, poetry by Derrick Brown

Awards

 National Defense Service Medal
 Best Local Poet, OC Weekly, 2000
 AFA Winner Poetry, 1997
 AFA Palomar College, CC Champion
 Two time winner of the Army Achievement Medal
 Expert Marksman, Grenadier, Driver, M60 award, 1991-1993
 Bank of America award for Drama, 1991

See also

 Write Bloody Publishing

References

External links 
 Official Website, Brownpoetry.com
 Write Bloody Publishing
 Audio of "A Finger and Two Dots", "Pussycat Lust Blaster", "CPR," "How The Jellyfish Wishes" and "The Demon's First Date" (among others) on Indiefeed Performance Poetry Channel
 Official Website for Derrick C. Brown concert film "You Belong Everywhere"

American male poets
American male singer-songwriters
American singer-songwriters
Living people
Place of birth missing (living people)
1973 births
21st-century American poets
21st-century American male singers
21st-century American singers
21st-century American male writers